Walter Wilkinson (born 2 November 1944) is a male former athlete who competed for England.

Athletics career
Wilkinson was selected by England to represent his country in athletics events. He was a 1,500 metres AAA National champion, he was denied a second national title in 1966 when he was defeated into second place in the 1 mile event by John Camien, a guest runner from the United States.

He won a bronze medal in the 1,500 metres at the 1969 European Indoor Championships in Belgrade in 1969.

He represented England in the 1 mile race, at the 1966 British Empire and Commonwealth Games in Kingston, Jamaica.

References

1944 births
Living people
English male middle-distance runners
Athletes (track and field) at the 1966 British Empire and Commonwealth Games
Commonwealth Games competitors for England